"Gravel Pit" is a single released by the Wu-Tang Clan featuring Paulissa Moorman & Dave Pendlebury for their album The W.  It was not as popular in the U.S. as other Wu-Tang Clan singles like "C.R.E.A.M." and "Uzi (Pinky Ring)" . It did, however, receive major radio play, and topped the music video show 106 and Park for two weeks straight. It is also the Wu-Tang's only Top 40 hit in the UK, peaking at number six.  In October 2011, NME placed it at number 116 on its list "150 Best Tracks of the Past 15 Years".

The chorus of the song: "Back, back and forth and forth..." is taken from the funk group Cameo's single "Back And Forth".  The hook of the song: "Check out my gravel pit..." is sung by Paulissa Moorman. According to The Wu-Tang Manual the beat for the track was sampled from Antoine Duhamel's soundtrack to a French TV miniseries entitled Belphegor.

The song features verses from three of the Wu-Tang Clan's MCs, Method Man, Ghostface Killah and U-God, as well as spoken bits from RZA and Raekwon.

Music video
The music video, directed by Joseph Kahn, features the Wu-Tang Clan arguing in their elevator-like time machine, and in argument accidentally sending themselves back to "2,000,000 BC", even though Method Man claimed they were going back to 2000 B.C. "2,000,000 BC" bears strong resemblance to the representation of the Stone Age in The Flintstones. The "gravel pit" is a large, fancy pit made from stone and bones.  The "pit", apparently a casino, contains a fountain, Stone Age cars, dancing women - including the actress Tamala Jones, credited as "Crystal Diamonds" - and large dinosaurs. It appears to be ruled by the Wu-Tang Clan (with the exception of Ol' Dirty Bastard, who was incarcerated at the time - he "appears" as a pair of enchained arms hanging out of a makeshift jail cell), who now have "stone age" personas and clothing. At the end of the video "Bo Rockhard" (Bokeem Woodbine), a rival ninja, challenges the Wu-Tang ninjas, RZA leads ninjas and fights off a horde of rival ninjas attacking the pit. The track's ending soundbite (as well as many found on the album) comes from the movie Short Eyes.

Each Wu-Tang member adopts a different name in the video. RZA becomes "Bobby Boulders", Meth is "Joe Quarry", Ol' Dirty Bastard becomes "Ol' Dirty Blocks", Ghostface is renamed "Frank Stoney", Raekwon is "Lex Rockhead", and U-God is "Stonefingers".

Samples
The song uses two samples. The trumpet introduction comes from "It's a Man's Man's Man's World" by James Brown, while the sample running along the whole song is taken from the French TV miniseries Belphegor'''s main titles. It also took samples from the films Enter the Dragon and Short Eyes''.

Charts

Weekly charts

Year-end charts

Certifications

References

Wu-Tang Clan songs
Music videos directed by Joseph Kahn
Song recordings produced by RZA
Songs written by Method Man
2000 songs
2000 singles